Lokve may refer to:

 Lokve, Serbia, a village near Alibunar, Serbia
 Lokve, Croatia, a municipality in Gorski Kotar, Croatia
 Lake Lokve, an artificial lake in Gorski Kotar, Croatia
 Lokve, Krško, a village in Slovenia
 Lokve, Nova Gorica, a village in Slovenia
 Lokve, Črnomelj, a village in Slovenia
 Lokve (Foča), a village in Bosnia and Herzegovina
 Lokve (Hadžići), a village in Bosnia and Herzegovina
 Lokve, Čapljina, a village in Bosnia and Herzegovina
 Lokve pri Dobrniču, a village near Trebnje, Slovenia